The 1988 Team Ice Racing World Championship was the tenth edition of the Team World Championship. The final was held on ?, 1988, in Grenoble, France. The Soviet Union won their eighth title.

Classification

See also 
 1988 Individual Ice Speedway World Championship
 1988 Speedway World Team Cup in classic speedway
 1988 Individual Speedway World Championship in classic speedway

References 

Ice speedway competitions
World